Catherine Quéré (born 16 March 1948 in Angoulême, Charente) is a French politician and a member of the Socialist Party.

A vice-president of the Poitou-Charentes Regional Council between 2004 and 2007, she was the MP for Charente-Maritime's 3rd constituency from 2007 to 2017. She was a member of the Socialist, Radical, Citizen and Miscellaneous Left parliamentary group.

Political career

Poitou-Charentes Regional Council (2004−2007)
A wine grower by profession, Catherine Quéré began her political career in the 2004 regional elections.

She figured in second position on the socialist list in Charente-Maritime and was elected as a regional councillor in Poitou-Charentes. She was a vice-president of the Poitou-Charentes Regional Council during three years (2004–2007).

On 9 July 2007, she resigned as a regional councillor in accordance with the rule of the "unique mandate" instituted within the Poitou-Charentes Regional Council.

MP of Saintes (2007−2017)
In the 2007 legislative election, Catherine Quéré defeated Xavier de Roux, mayor of Chaniers and outgoing MP.

In the first round, she arrived in second position (31.99%, 15,446 votes) whereas Xavier de Roux came first with 39.43% (19.037 votes). In the run-off, she was elected with 52.02% (25.501 votes) as an MP of the Charente-Maritime's 3rd constituency.

In the 2012 legislative election, she was largely re-elected as an MP of the Charente-Maritime's 3rd constituency.

In the first round, she largely came first with 43.96% (20,403 votes) and in the run-off was re-elected as an MP with 59.12% (26,574 votes).

She did not contest the 2017 French legislative election.

Political mandates

National mandate
 MP of the Charente-Maritime's 3rd constituency (20 June 2007-2017): Socialist, Radical, Citizen and Miscellaneous Left parliamentary group; secretary of the committee of the sustainable development and spatial planning, vice-president of the friendship groups of France/Macedonia and France/Malaysia.

Former local mandate
 Vice-president of the Poitou-Charentes Regional Council : 28 March 2004 – 1 September 2007

References

External links
  Official website
  Catherine Quéré's official biography, French National Assembly

1948 births
Living people
People from Angoulême
Socialist Party (France) politicians
Politics of Poitou-Charentes
Women members of the National Assembly (France)
Deputies of the 13th National Assembly of the French Fifth Republic
Deputies of the 14th National Assembly of the French Fifth Republic
21st-century French women politicians